Oran Park may refer to:
Oran Park, New South Wales, a suburb of Sydney in Australia
Oran Park (homestead), a heritage listed homestead in the suburb of Oran Park
Oran Park Raceway, a former motor racing circuit in Sydney, Australia
Oran Park Chargers, rugby league team